Frederick Carl Sherman (May 27, 1888 – July 27, 1957) was a highly decorated admiral of the United States Navy during World War II.

Early life
Sherman was born in Port Huron, Michigan on May 27, 1888. His grandfather, Loren Sherman, was the longtime editor and publisher of The Daily Times in Port Huron. His father, Frederick Ward Sherman, sold the newspaper in 1907 and moved to California, where he was editor and publisher of The Daily Independent in Santa Barbara in 1911.

Naval career
Sherman graduated from the United States Naval Academy in 1910. He served as commanding officer of submarines  and  during World War I.

He commanded  from 1940 until her loss in the Battle of the Coral Sea. Captain Sherman was the last man to leave the sinking ship. His wife wrote a book titled Admiral Wags which told the story of the family cocker spaniel who accompanied Sherman during his command of Lexington. The dog can be seen in war footage used in the John Wayne movie In Harm's Way. Promoted to rear admiral, he served as assistant chief of staff to Commander in Chief Atlantic Fleet, Admiral Ernest King until the end of 1942. He served in the Fast Carrier Task Force, as Commander, Carrier Division 2 in 1943, and as Commander, Task Group 38.3 in 1944–45.

Sherman was a three-time recipient of the Navy Cross. Promoted to vice admiral in 1945, he became Commander, United States Fifth Fleet before retiring in 1947. Upon retirement, he was promoted to admiral on the retired list.

Later life and legacy
Sherman wrote Combat Command, a history of the Pacific Theater of World War II, drawing on his personal experiences. Combat Command was published in 1950 by E.P. Dutton Inc, and again by Bantam Books in 1982.

Sherman appeared on the Groucho Marx radio game show You Bet Your Life on January 4, 1950, where he mentioned his greatest thrill as being on the bridge of the USS Missouri in Tokyo Bay, watching the Japanese sign surrender terms at the end of World War II. He and a recent naval recruit contested the major prize of $1000 but were unsuccessful.

Sherman died on 27 July 1957 in San Diego, California, and the Frederick C. Sherman Field on nearby San Clemente Island was dedicated in his honor on 11 January 1961.

Decorations
Here is the ribbon bar of Vice Admiral Frederick C. Sherman:

References

 
 History of St. Clair County, Michigan, by William Lee Jenks, 1911

External links
 Vice-Admiral Frederick Carl Sherman – from Microworks.net

1888 births
1957 deaths
People from Port Huron, Michigan
Military personnel from Michigan
United States Naval Aviators
United States submarine commanders
United States Naval Academy alumni
United States Navy vice admirals
United States Navy personnel of World War I
Recipients of the Navy Cross (United States)
Recipients of the Navy Distinguished Service Medal
Recipients of the Legion of Merit
United States Navy World War II admirals